Quiet Days in Hollywood (also known as The Way We Are) is a 1997 German drama film written by Robert G. Brown and Josef Rusnak and directed by Rusnak. The film stars Hilary Swank, Chad Lowe, and Natasha Gregson Wagner.

Plot
The plot features a series of interlocking stories. Each vignette is introduced with a character that had sex with someone in the previous segment. The movie opens with a seventeen-year-old prostitute, Lolita (Hilary Swank), who hangs around outside movie premiere with another teen prostitute in the hopes of getting a picture of her idol, movie star Peter Blaine (Peter Dobson). After her friend is forcibly dragged off by a jealous boyfriend, Lolita wanders around by herself in the streets of Los Angeles. Then she ends up performing a sexual favor for a man who ends up knocking her unconscious.

The man, a young African American named Angel, is engaged in questionable criminal activities. He later ends up trying to flee Los Angeles after he makes a major mistake during a drug deal. He takes Julie, a young waitress (Meta Golding), with him. After they have sex in a stolen car while driving through a car wash, Julie rethinks her plans to escape with Angel. After she notices that a car filled with men has been shadowing them, she runs out of the car. Angel is killed by the men.

Sometime later, Julie is working in an upscale restaurant as a waitress. She waits on Richard (Chad Lowe) who ends up sexually assaulting her in the men's room. In the next vignette, Richard has a tryst with Kathy (Natasha Gregson Wagner), his boss's wife. Kathy has a non-exclusive relationship with her husband, Bobby (Bill Cusack), who has a girlfriend on the side. Bobby is sexually propositioned by Patrick (Stephen Mailer), a sexually aggressive and drug addicted gay man, who is the closeted Blaine's boyfriend. The last vignette features a grief-stricken Blaine seeking sexual favors and companionship from Lolita, who is still sporting a bruise from her encounter with Angel.

Release and reception
Quiet Days in Hollywood premiered in its native Germany on July 13, 1997, having also been shown at the film market of the 1997 Cannes Film Festival. On July 11, 2000, it was released onto DVD in the United States. Variety's Deborah Young wrote in June 1997, "Rusnak focuses on the performances of his young cast, not all of whom are able to climb above the unconvincing, often stilted dialogue and coincidence-laden plot. On the plus side, his stories are just non-American enough to offer a fresh view of an over-filmed town." She also praised the "modern" look of the film.

Cast
 Hilary Swank as Lolita
 Peter Dobson as Peter Blaine
 Meta Golding as Julie
 Chad Lowe as Richard
 Natasha Gregson Wagner as Kathy
 Bill Cusack as Bobby
 Stephen Mailer as Patrick

References

External links 
 
 
 

1997 films
1997 drama films
German independent films
English-language German films
Films set in Los Angeles
Films scored by Harald Kloser
1990s English-language films
Films directed by Josef Rusnak